George W. Bush's political career, personal life and professional career have been the subject of numerous books, filmed programs, and article accounts and assessments. Bush's response to the 9/11 terrorist attacks, his actions as commander and chief in initiating and directing the Afghanistan and Iraq conflicts, and his economic policies have been debated heatedly by partisans, analysts, and academics. He also came in for criticism from conservatives in his own party for his Medicare reforms covering prescription drugs and for his immigration reform plan, which did not pass. 

Liberal academic commentator Paul Krugman published a collection of his columns under the title, The Great Unraveling in September, 2003  that criticized the George W. Bush administration's economic and foreign policies. Krugman's main argument was that the large deficits generated by the Bush administration — generated by decreasing taxes, increasing public spending, and fighting the Iraq war — were in the long run unsustainable, and would eventually generate a major economic crisis. The book was a best-seller. Conservative commentator Ann Coulter's book Slander, argued that President George W. Bush was given unfair negative media coverage.

See also
List of books and films about George W. Bush

References

Presidency of George W. Bush